Yorgason is a surname. Notable people with the surname include:

Blaine Yorgason (born 1942), American writer, brother of Brenton
Brenton G. Yorgason (1945–2016), American novelist and writer